Lac de Grandval is a lake in Cantal, France. At an elevation of 742 m, its surface area is 11 km².

The lake lies in the communes of Alleuze, Faverolles and Fridefont; at its western end is the hydroelectric dam, between Lavastrie and Fridefont.

Grandval
Landforms of Cantal